Bruce A. Bickford (born October 11, 1955) is an American politician from Maine. A Republican from Auburn, Bickford serves in the Maine House of Representatives. He was elected in 2008, 2010, 2014, 2016, 2018, and 2020. As of 2021, he is a member of the Taxation Committee as well as the Joint Select Committee on Marijuana Legalization Implementation.

In March 2021, Bickford jokingly referred to convicted rapist Harvey Weinstein during legislative hearings via his Zoom background. It was announced that he would be investigated by the Maine House of Representatives' human resources department.

Bickford graduated from Edward Little High School in 1973. He has worked as a restaurant manager, realtor, and other small businesses.

References

1955 births
Living people
Republican Party members of the Maine House of Representatives
Politicians from Auburn, Maine
Edward Little High School alumni